The sixth competition weekend of the 2022–23 ISU Speed Skating World Cup will be held at the Ice Arena in Tomaszów Mazowiecki, Poland, from 17 to 19 February 2023.

Medal summary

Men's events

 In mass start, race points are accumulated during the race based on results of the intermediate sprints and the final sprint. The skater with most race points is the winner.

Women's events

 In mass start, race points are accumulated during the race based on results of the intermediate sprints and the final sprint. The skater with most race points is the winner.

Results

Men's events

500 m
The race started on 18 February at 14:26.

1000 m
The race started on 19 February at 15:37.

1500 m
The race started on 17 February at 17:00.

5000 m
The race started on 18 February at 15:05.

Mass start
The race started on 19 February at 16:39.

Team sprint
The race started on 17 February 2023 at 19:15.

Women's events

500 m
The race started on 17 February at 17:40.

1000 m
The race started on 19 February at 15:02.

1500 m
The race started on 18 February at 13:45.

3000 m
The race started on 17 February at 18:19.

Mass start
The race started on 19 February at 16:20.

Team sprint
The race started on 18 February 2023 at 16:19.

References

ISU World Cup, 2022-23, 6
6
ISU Speed Skating World Cup, 2022-23, World Cup 6
ISU
ISU